The Estevez–Mansfield–Clarkson equation is a nonlinear partial differential equation introduced by Pilar Estevez, Elizabeth Mansfield, and Peter Clarkson.

If U is a function of some other variables x, y, t, then we denote  by Utyy, and so on. With that notation, the equation is

 

in which

References

Graham W. Griffiths William E. Shiesser, Traveling Wave Analysis of Partial Differential Equations, Academy Press
 Richard H. Enns George C. McCGuire, Nonlinear Physics Birkhauser, 1997
Inna Shingareva, Carlos Lizárraga-Celaya, Solving Nonlinear Partial Differential Equations with Maple Springer.
Eryk Infeld and George Rowlands, Nonlinear Waves, Solitons and Chaos, Cambridge 2000
Saber Elaydi, An Introduction to Difference Equations, Springer 2000
Dongming Wang, Elimination Practice, Imperial College Press 2004
 David Betounes, Partial Differential Equations for Computational Science: With Maple and Vector Analysis, Springer, 1998 
 George Articolo, Partial Differential Equations & Boundary Value Problems with Maple V, Academic Press 1998 

Nonlinear partial differential equations